The following is a partial list of albums released through Priority Records. Any additional record labels involved are specified in brackets.

1970s

1976
 Funkadelic – Hardcore Jollies (emeka)

1978
 Funkadelic – One Nation Under A Groove (555567)

1979
 Funkadelic – Uncle Jam Wants You (53875)
 Juluka – Universal Men (57144)

1980s

1980
 Carole King – Pearls: Songs Of Goffin & King (53879)

1981
 Funkadelic – The Electric Spanking Of War Babies (53874)
 Juluka – African Litany (57145)
 Radio Kings – It Ain't Easy (50535)

1982
 Juluka – Scatterlings Of Africa (50594)
 Juluka – Ubuhle Bemvelo (57146)

1984
 Armored Saint – March of the Saint (50541)
 Juluka – Musa Ukungilandela  (57149)

1985
 Armored Saint – Delirious Nomad (50539)
 The Showboys – The Ten Laws of Rap / Cold Frontin (PRO-7074)

1986
 The Showboys –  Drag Rap (PRO-7111)

1987
 Greatest Hits Of The Street – Rappin' and Scratchin' (4XL-9469)
 The California Raisins –  The California Raisins Sing the Hit Songs (51340)
 Armored Saint – Raising Fear (50540)
 N.W.A – N.W.A and the Posse (57119)

1988
 Big Lady K – Bigger Than Life (57109)
 Eazy-E – Eazy-Duz-It (57100)
 Eazy-E – Eazy-Duz-It "Edit Version" (57111)
 EPMD – Strictly Business (57135)
 Geto Boys – Making Trouble (57134)
N.W.A – Straight Outta Compton (57102)
 N.W.A – Straight Outta Compton "Edit Version" (57112)

1989
 Awesome Dre And The Hardcore Committee – You Can't Hold Me Back (57114)
 EPMD – Unfinished Business (57136)
 Geto Boys – Grip It! On That Other Level (57190)
 Low Profile – We're In This Together (57116)
 Nice & Smooth – Nice & Smooth (53887)
 Willie Dee – Controversy (57133)

1990s

1990
 Bobby Jimmy & The Critters – Hip Hop Prankster (57117)
 Cheb Mami – Let Me Rai (57142)
 Choice – The Big Payback (57132)
 David Hewitt – The Storyteller (57176)
 Goo Goo Dolls – Hold Me Up (53917)
 Gwar – Scumdogs of the Universe (53904)
 Ice Cube – AmeriKKKa's Most Wanted (57120)
 Ice Cube – AmeriKKKa's Most Wanted "Edit Version" (57130)
 Ice Cube – Kill At Will EP
 N.W.A – 100 Miles and Runnin' EP
 Ozzy Osbourne – Ten Commandments (57129)
 Tres – Hold On To Your Dreams (57113)
 Y&T – Yesterday & Today Live (53924)

1991
 415 – 41Fivin' (57153)
 Armored Saint – Symbol of Salvation (53923)
 Bongo Logic – Despierta (57141)
 Convict – Convicts (57152)
 David Hewitt – An African Tapestry (57140)
 Edward II – Wicked Men (57178)
 Geto Boys – We Can't Be Stopped (57161)
 Geto Boys – We Can't Be Stopped "Edit Version" (57171)
 Fates Warning – Parallels (53918)
 Ice Cube – Death Certificate (57155)
 The Itals – Easy To Catch (57159)
 Juluka – The Best Of Juluka (57138)
 KMC – Three Men With The Power Of Ten (57122)
 Manfred Mann's Plain Music – Plain Music (57123)
 Manazart – Too Much Pressure (57154)
 N.W.A – Niggaz4Life (57126)
 O.G. Style – I Know How To Play 'Em! (57151)
 Scarface – Mr. Scarface Is Back (57167)
 Scarface – Mr. Scarface Is Back "Edit Version" (57182)
 The Terrorists – Terror Strikes: Always Bizness, Never Personal (57173)
 Tres – Dejame Sentir Tu Amor  (57118)
 WC and the Maad Circle – Ain't a Damn Thang Changed (57156)
 WC & The Maad Circle – Ain't a Damn Thang Changed "Edit Version" (57169)

1992
 415 – Nu Niggaz on Tha Blokkk (57163)
 Barefoot – Dance Of Life (57125)
 Big Mello – Bone Hard ziggiN (57175)
 Bushwick Bill – Little Big Man (57189)
 Choice – Stick N Moove (57172)
 Dr. Dre – The Chronic (57128)
 Eazy-E – 5150: Home 4 Tha Sick EP (53815)
 Ganksta NIP – The South Park Psycho (57160)
 Geto Boys – Uncut Dope: Geto Boys' Best (57183)
 Geto Boys – Uncut Dope: Geto Boys' Best "Edit Version" (57196)
 Gwar – America Must Be Destroyed (53906)
 Ice Cube – The Predator (57185)
 Ice Cube – The Predator "Edit Version" (57198)
 JT The Bigga Figga – Don't Stop til We Major (50574)
 Maestro Alex Gregory – Paganini's Last Stand (57158)
 MC Ren – Kizz My Black Azz EP (53802)
 Mod Squad – People's Park (57157)
 Penthouse Player's Clique – Paid The Cost (57181)
 Prince Johnny C – It's Been A Long Rhyme Coming (57179)
 Raheem – The Invincible (57180)
 Seagram – The Dark Roads (57192)
 Skrew – Burning in Water, Drowning in Flame (53919)
 Slammin' Gladys – Slammin' Gladys (57162)
 Sons Of Selassie – Changes (57170)
 Too Much Trouble – Bringing Hell On Earth (57174)
 Willie Dee – I'm Goin' Out Lika Soldier (57188)

1993
 2Low – Funky Lil' Brotha (53884)
 5th Ward Boyz – Ghetto Dope (53859)
 Bass Hit – Bass Is Loaded (50598)
 Bass Quake – Bass Quake (50614)
 Carole King – Colour Of Your Dreams (57197)
 Carole King – In Concert (53878)
 The Conscious Daughters – Ear to the Street (53877)
 DMG – Rigormortiz (53862)
 Ganksta NIP – Psychic Thoughts (53860)
 Geto Boys – Till Death Do Us Part (57191)
 Ice Cube – Lethal Injection (53876)
 Ice Cube – Lethal Injection "Edit Version" (53888)
 Ice-T – Home Invasion (53858)
 Johnny Clegg & Savuka – In My African Dream (53912)
 Joyfinger – Pimps Of Babylon (53868)
 JT The Bigga Figga – Playaz N the Game (50554)
 Mercyful Fate – In the Shadows (53892)
 Sam Kinison – Live from Hell (53863)
 Sat N Smooth – The Awakening (53869)
 Scarface – The World Is Yours (53861)
 Too Much Trouble – Player's Choice (57186)

1994
 5th Ward Boyz – Gangsta Funk EP (53844)
 Arson Garden – The Belle Stomp (53894)
 Bakamono – The Cry Of The Turkish Fig Peddler (53949)
 Bass Shock – Dungeon Of Bass (50600)
 Big Mello – Wegonefunkwichamind (53897)
 Big Mike – Somethin' Serious (53907)
 Blac Monks – Secrets of the Hidden Temple (53898)
 Carole King – Time Gone By (53880)
 Da Lench Mob – Planet of da Apes (53939)
 Dieselmeat – Happily (53893)
 Don Jagwarr – Faded (53926)
 Engines Of Aggression – Inhuman Nature (53883)
 Fates Warning – Inside Out (53915)
 Flycatcher – Ovulation (53895)
 Foreigner – Mr. Moonlight (53961)
 Foreskin 500 – Manpussy (53899)
 Get Low Playaz – Straight Out Tha Labb (50555)
 Gwar – The Road Behind EP (53905)
 Gwar – This Toilet Earth (53889)
 Ice Cube – Bootlegs & B-Sides (53921)
 Lil 1/2 Dead – The Dead Has Arisen (53937)
 Mad Flava – From Tha Ground Unda (57199)
 Magnapop – Hot Boxing (53909)
 Mercyful Fate – The Bell Witch EP (53911)
 Mercyful Fate – Time (53942)
 Odd Squad – Fadanuf Fa Erybody!! (53866)
 Pauly Shore – Pink Diggily Diggily (53881)
 Paris – Guerrilla Funk (53882)
 Paris – Guerrilla Funk "Edit Version" (53931)
 San Quinn – Live N Direct (53982)
 Seagram – Reality Check (53908)
 Skrew – Dusted (53902)
 Tim Smooth – Straight Up Drivin' Em (53891)
 Timco – Friction Tape (53900)

1995
 Al Kapone – Da Ressurrection (50528)
 Bass Connection – Hi Voltage Bass (50599)
 Bass Erotica – Sexual Bass (50622)
 Bluebirds – Swamp Stomp (50534)
 Boyz Of Paradize – Boyz Of Paradize (53989)
 Brotha Lynch Hung – Season of da Siccness (53967)
 Buccinator – Great Painter Rafael (53951)
 The B.U.M.S. – Lyfe 'N' Tyme (53886)
 C-Funk – Three Dimensional Ear Pleasure (53971)
 Cold World Hustlers – Iceland (53990)
 Christopher Cross – Window (53960)
 Curtis Salgado – More Than You Can Chew (53930)
 Don McMinn – Painkiller Blues (50566)
 E.S.G. – Sailin' Da South (53973)
 Eazy-E – Eternal E (50544)
 Grip Inc. – Power of Inner Strength (53964)
 Gwar – Ragnarök (50527)
 JT the Bigga Figga – Dwellin' in tha Labb (53981)
 King Diamond – The Spider's Lullabye (53965)
 Mack 10 – Mack 10 (53938)
 Margi Coleman – Margi (53903)
 Master P – 99 Ways To Die (53979)
 Mia X – Good Girl Gone Bad (53988)
 Mr. Doctor – Setripn' Bloccstyle (53975)
 Radio Kings – Live At B.B. King's (50530)
 Sham & The Professor – Split Personalities (53941)
 Sons of Elvis – Glodean (53896)
 Tha Dogg Pound – Dogg Food (50546)
 Tony Sarno – It's A Blues Thing (50524)
 Trinity Garden Cartel – Don't Blame It On Da Music (53890)
 TRU – True  (53983)
 Watts Gangstas – The Real (53986)

1996
 20-2-Life – Twenty Two Life (50682)
 Ace Deuce – Comin' Up N' Da Ghetto (50567)
 Adults – Action Street (50584)
 Bass Connection – Drivin' Bass (50615)
 Bass Cult – The Dark Side (50624)
 Bass Erotica – Bass Ecstacy (50616)
 Bass Erotica – Erotic Bass Delight (50601)
 Bass Hit – Sub Shaker (50628)
 Bass Quake – Bass After Shock (50620)
 Bluebirds – South From Memphis (50575)
 Cellmates – Stories Of Tha Damned (50568)
 Christopher Franke – Celestine Prophecy (50571)
 Cold Blue Steel – Headed Out Of Memphis (50523)
 The Conscious Daughters – Gamers (53994)
 The Conscious Daughters – Gamers "Edit Version" (50549)
 Cutty Ranks – Six Million Ways to Die (53871)
 Engines Of Aggression – Speak EP (53804)
 Foe – Scissorhands (50582)
 Foreskin 500 – Starbent But Superfreaked (50526)
 Gary B.B. Coleman – Cocaine Annie (50580)
 Get Some Crew – 1-900-Get-Some  (50596)
 Heltah Skeltah – Nocturnal (50532)
 Heltah Skeltah – Nocturnal "Edit Version"  (50637)
 Ice-T – Ice-T VI: Return of the Real (53933)
 J-Mack – Crime Rate (50572)
 Jay-Z – Reasonable Doubt (50592)
 Jay-Z – Reasonable Doubt "Edit Version" (50041)
 Karen Domino White & Friends – Open Our Eyes (50629)
 King Diamond – The Graveyard (50587)
 Lil 1/2 Dead – Steel on a Mission (53984)
 Magic City DJ's – 2 Much Bass (50632)
 Magnapop – Rubbing Doesn't Help (53992)
 Marilyns – Fumbled By Karma (50536)
 Master P – Ice Cream Man (53978)
 Me & My Cousin – International (53558)
 The Memphis Horns – Wishing You A Merry Christmas (50630)
 Mercyful Fate – Into The Unknown (50586)
 Mr. Ill – The Rebirth (50638)
 N.W.A – Greatest Hits (50561)
 No Good But So Good – Up To No Good (50647)
 Originoo Gunn Clappaz – Da Storm (50577)
 Ras Kass – Soul on Ice (50529)
 San Quinn – Hustle Continues (50573)
 Seff Tha Gaffla – Livin' Kinda Lavish (53980)
 Sh'Killa – Gangstrez From Da Bay (50558)
 Silkk The Shocker – The Shocker (50591)
 Skull Duggery – Hoodlum fo' Life (50543)
 Skrew – Shadow Of Doubt (50559)
 Westside Connection – Bow Down (50583)
 Westside Connection – Bow Down "Edit Version" (50650)
 Wreckless Klan – Blowin' Up Tha Scene (50686)
 X Members – Down With The Average Joe (50542)
 Young Murder Squad – How We Livin (50557)1997
 Ant Banks – Big Thangs (50698) Ant Banks – Big Thangs "Edit Version" (50735) Boot Camp Clik – For The People (50646) Boot Camp Clik – For The People "Edit Version" (50706) Brotha Lynch Hung – Loaded (50648) Company Flow – Funcrusher Plus (50063) D-Flexx – Planet Playa (50678) The Delinquents – Big Moves (50680) DJ Taz – Worldwide (50736) DJ Taz – Worldwide "Edit Version" (50737) Heltah Skeltah – Magnum Force (53543) Heltah Skeltah – Magnum Force "Limited Edition" (50023) Ice Cube – Featuring...Ice Cube
 Kane & Abel – 7 Sins (50634) Killarmy – Silent Weapons for Quiet Wars (50633) Kock D.Zel – Dreams II Reality (50602) Mack 10 – Based on a True Story (50675) Mack 10 – Based On A True Story "Edit Version" (50748) Mark May – Telephone Road (50690) Master P – Ghetto D (50659) Master P – Ghetto D "Edit Version" (50749) Mia X – Unlady Like (50705) Mr. Serv-On – Life Insurance (50717) Organized Konfusion – The Equinox (50560) Organized Konfusion – The Equinox "Edit Version" (50734) Phobos – Phobos (50072) Point Blank – N Tha Do (50701) PSK-13 – Born Bad? (50746) Steady Mobb'n – Pre-Meditated Drama (50704) Stephen Simmonds – Simmonds Alone (50054) Tha Truth – Makin' Moves... Everyday (50553) Tha Truth – Makin' Moves... Everyday "Edit Version" (50649) Timco – Gentleman Jim (50525) TRU – Tru 2 da Game (50660)1998
 AllFrumTha I – Allfrumtha I (50588) AllFrumTha I – AllFrumTha I "Edit Version" (53537) Anotha Level – On Anotha Level (53867) Bad Azz – Word on tha Streets (50741) Big Ed – The Assassin (50729) Black Star – Mos Def & Talib Kweli Are Black Star (50065) C-Loc – Ya Heard Me (50732) C-Murder – Life Or Death (50723) C-Murder – Life Or Death "Edit Version" (53540) Cocoa Brovaz – The Rude Awakening (50699) Concentration Camp – Da Halocaust (53536) Daz Dillinger – Retaliation, Revenge and Get Back (53524) Fiend – There's One in Every Family (50715) Full Blooded – Memorial Day (50027) Gangsta Profile – Fire Redrum (50645) Gambino Family – Ghetto Organized (50718) Ghetto Commission – Wise Guys (50011) Ice Cube – War & Peace Vol. 1 (The War Disc) (50700) Ice Cube – War & Peace Vol. 1 (The War Disc) "Edit Version" (50022) Kane & Abel – Am I My Brother's Keeper (50720) Killarmy – Dirty Weaponry (50014) Mac – Shell Shocked (50727) Mack 10 – The Recipe (53512) Mack 10 – The Recipe "Edit Version" (53549) Magic – Sky's The Limit (50017) Master P – MP Da Last Don (53538) Master P – MP Da Last Don "Edit Version" (53548) Master P – The Ghettos Tryin To kill Me!: Limited Edition (50696) Mia X – Mama Drama (53502) Mia X – Mama Drama "Edit Version" (50049) Michel'le – Hung Jury (53530) Mr. Quikk – 69 Wayz (50024) NuSound – Erotic Moods Vol. 1
 Pish Posh – Up Jumps The Boogie (50067) Prime Suspects – Guilty 'til Proven Innocent (50728) Ras Kass – Rasassination (50739) Sauce Money – Middle Finger U
 Silkk The Shocker – Charge It 2 Da Game (50716) Silkk The Shocker – Charge It 2 Da Game "Edit Version" (53541) Snoop Dogg – Da Game Is to Be Sold, Not to Be Told (50000) Snoop Dogg – Da Game Is To Be Sold, Not To Be Told "Edit Version" (50006) Spasmik – Phunkotron  (53529)
 Spirit Level – Of Earth And Sky (50009) Sons Of Funk – The Game of Funk (50725) Soulja Slim – Give It 2 'Em Raw (53547) Steady Mobb'n – Black Mafia (50026) Various artist – Straight Outta Compton: N.W.A 10th Anniversary Tribute (53532) Various artist – Straight Outta Compton: N.W.A 10th Anniversary Tribute "Edit Version"  (50025) Wu-Tang Killa Bees – The Swarm Vol. 1 (50013) Young Bleed – My Balls and My Word (50738)'''

1999
 5th Ward Boyz – P.W.A. The Album... Keep It Poppin (50125)
 Big Mike – Hard to Hit (50104)
 Black Moon – War Zone (50039)
 C-Murder – Bossalinie (50035)
 C-Murder – Bossalinie "Edit Version"  (50036)
 Chilldrin of da Ghetto – Chilldrin of da Ghetto (50020)
 Choclair – Ice Cold (50151)
 CJ Mac – Platinum Game (53533)
 Company Flow – Little Johnny From The Hospitul: Breaks And Instrumentals, Vol. 1 (50101)
 DB Bass Killaz – Bass Drag Racing (50059)
 DJ Dara – Renegade Continuum (50066)
 DJ Dara – Renegade Continuum 2 (50068)
 DJ Spinna – Heavy Beats Vol. 1 (50070)
 Fiend – Street Life (50107)
 The High & Mighty – Home Field Advantage (50121)
 The High & Mighty – Home Field Advantage "Edit Version" (50136)
 JT Money – Pimpin' on Wax  (50060)
 JT Money – Pimpin' On Wax "Edit Version" (50105)
 Kacino – Life Is A Gamble (50075)
 Lil Italy – On Top of da World (50108)
 Lil Soldiers – Boot Camp (50038)
 Mac – World War III (50109)
 Magic – Thuggin' (50110)
 Master P – Only God Can Judge Me (50092)
 Master P – Only God Can Judge Me "Edit Version" (50091)
 MC Eiht – Section 8 (50021)
 Mercedes – Rear End (50085)
 Mo B. Dick – Gangsta Harmony (50721)
 Mos Def – Black On Both Sides (50141)
 Mos Def – Black On Both Sides "Edit Version" (50142)
 Mr. Mike – Rhapsody (50031)
 Mr. Serv-On – Da Next Level (50045)
 NuSound – Erotic Moods Vol. 2 (50144)
 Originoo Gunn Clappaz – The M-Pire Shrikez Back (50116)
 Pharoahe Monch – Internal Affairs (50137)
 Pharoahe Monch – Internal Affairs "Edit Version" (50138)
 Shyheim – Manchild (50058)
 Silkk The Shocker – Made Man (50003)
 Silkk The Shocker – Made Man "Edit Version" (50037)
 Snoop Dogg – No Limit Top Dogg (50052)
 Snoop Dogg – No Limit Top Dogg "Edit Version" (50080)
 TRU – Da Crime Family (50010)
 TRU – Da Crime Family "Edit Version" (50094)
 U-God – Golden Arms Redemption (50086)
 Wu-Syndicate – Wu-Syndicate (50056)

2000s
2000
 504 Boyz – Goodfellas (50722)
 504 Boyz – Goodfellas "Edit Version" (50093)
 Big L – The Big Picture C-Murder – Trapped in Crime (50083)
 The Comrads – Wake Up & Ball (50001)
 Dame Grease – Live On Lenox (50112)
 Easy Mo Bee – Now Or Never: Odyssey 2000 (53521)
 Ice Cube – War & Peace Vol. 2 (The Peace Disc) (50015)
 Ice Cube – War & Peace Vol. 2 (The Peace Disc) "Edit Version" (50046)
 Lil' Romeo – Lil' Romeo (50198)
 Lil' Zane – Young World: The Future (50145)
 Mack 10 – The Paper Route (50148)
 Mack 10 – The Paper Route "Edit Version" (50149)
 MC Eiht – N' My Neighborhood (50103)
 Mr. Marcelo – Brick Livin' Snoop Dogg – Tha Last Meal (50153)
 Toni Estes – Two Eleven (50150)
 Young Bleed – My Own (50018)

2001
 Bad Azz – Personal Business (50076)
 C-Murder – C-P-3.com (50178)
 Da Beatminerz – Brace 4 Impak
 Hi-Tek – Hi-Teknology (50171)
 Krazy – Breather Life NuSound – Erotic Moods Vol. 3 (50160)
 Pish Posh – Indoor Storm (50163)
 Sarina Paris – Sarina Paris (50175)
 Silkk the Shocker – My World, My Way Smut Peddlers – Porn Again (50164)
 Snoop Doggy Dogg – Death Row: Snoop Doggy Dogg at His Best (50030)
 Snoop Doggy Dogg – Death Row: Snoop Doggy Dogg at His Best "Edit Version" (50032)
 Soulja Slim – The Streets Made Me Svala – The Real Me (50099)

2002
 Big Moe – Purple World Snoop Dogg – Paid tha Cost to Be da Boss2003
 Lil' Zane – The Big Zane Theory (50191)
 Roscoe – Young Roscoe Philaphornia Westside Connection – Terrorist Threats2009
 Snoop Dogg – Malice n Wonderland2010's
2010
 Cypress Hill – Rise Up Snoop Dogg – More Malice2011
 Snoop Dogg – Doggumentary2017
 Ripp Flamez – Project Melodies Various artists – Grow House (Original Motion Picture Soundtrack) G Perico – All Blue
 Various Artists – Rap Game–The Final Performance Jake&Papa – Tattoos&Blues A.D. & Sorry Jaynari – Last Of The '80s Tia London – Tia LondonCompilations and soundtracks
 Various Artists – Dance Around The World  (57143)
 Various Artists – Planet Reggae: The World Of Reggae Music  (57164)
 Various Artists – Planet Zouk: The World Of Antilles Music  (57165)
 Various Artists – Planet Africa: The World Of African Music  (57166)
 Various Artists – Rap A Lot's Underground Masters  (57168)
 Various Artists – Spirit Of Venice, CA: A Collection Of Venice Street Musicians  (57177)
 Various Artists – Rap A Lot's Underground Masters "Edit Version"  (57184)
 Various Artists – Planet Blues: The World Of Blues Rock  (57193)
 Various Artists – Old School Friday  (57194)
 Various Artists – Planet Dancehall: The World Of Raggamuffin  (57195)
 Various Artists – Straight From Da Streets Vol. 1  (53885)
 Various Artists – Classic Beats And Breaks Vol. 1  (53910)
 Various Artists – Classic Beats And Breaks Vol. 2  (53922)
 Various Artists – Guitars That Rule The World  (53925)
 Various Artists – Street Fighter  (53948)
 Various Artists – Extreme Velocity  (53952)
 Various Artists – Luminescence  (53954)
 Various Artists – Trance Ambient  (53956)
 Various Artists – Friday  (53959)
 Various Artists – Blackmarket Unreleased  (53966)
 Various Artists – Friday "Edit Version"  (53974)
 Various Artists – Classic Beats And Breaks Vol. 3  (53998)
 Various Artists – Classic Beats And Breaks Vol. 4  (53999)
 Various Artists – Bio Dome  (50552)
 Various Artists – Masters Of Blues  (50569)
 Various Artists – Brutal Bass: 60 Minutes Of Bass  (50570)
 Various Artists – Down South Hustlers  (53993)
 Various Artists – Cell Block Compilation  (50556)
 Various Artists – In The Beginning... There Was Rap  (50639)
 Various Artists – I'm Bout It  (50643)
 Various Artists – The Substitute  (50576)
 Various Artists – Guitars That Rule The World Vol. 2  (50589)
 Various Artists – Young Southern Playaz Vol. 1  (50590)
 Various Artists – Above The Rim  (50606)
 Various Artists – Above The Rim "Edit Version"  (50607)
 Various Artists – Murder Was The Case  (50610)
 Various Artists – Gang Related (53509)
 Various Artists – Bass 4 Bassheadz: Vol. 2  (50597)
 Various Artists – Bass 4 Bassheadz: Vol. 1  (50619)
 Various Artists – Bass 4 Bassheadz: Vol. 3  (50626)
 Various Artists – Trip Hop Nation Vol. 1  (50631)
 Various Artists – Rhyme & Reason  (50635)
 Various Artists – Bass 4 Bassheadz: Vol. 4  (50636)
 Various Artists – West Coast Bad Boyz Vol. 2  (50658)
 Various Artists – Death Row Greatest Hits  (50677)
 Various Artists – Young Southern Playaz Vol. 2  (50687)
 Various Artists – Trip Hop Til U Drop  (50679)
 Various Artists – Luke's Peep Show Compilation Vol. 1  (50681)
 Various Artists – Booty Bass Mix Vol. 1  (50692)
 Various Artists – West Coast Bad Boyz: Anotha Level Of The game  (50695)
 Various Artists – The Best Of Black Market Records: Hounds Of Tha Underground  (50697)
 Various Artists – Ultimate Bass Challenge Vol. 1  (50043)
 Various Artists – Electro: Breaks Beats And Bass  (50012)
 Various Artists – Booty Party Ta' Go  (50028)
 Various Artists – Thicker Than Water  (50016)
 Various Artists – Thicker Than Water "Edit Version"  (50047)
 Various Artists – No Limit Soldiers Compilation: We Can't Be Stopped "Edit Version"  (50048)
 Various Artists – Foolish  (50053)
 Various Artists – Lyricist Lounge Vol. 1  (50062)
 Various Artists – Soundbombing I  (50064)
 Various Artists – Soundbombing II "Edit Version"  (50074)
 Various Artists – Soundbombing II  (50069)
 Various Artists – Foolish "Edit Version"  (50071)
 Various Artists – Old School Ghetto Booty  (50078)
 Various Artists – Pure Flamenco  (50079)
 Various Artists – Bass 4 Bassheadz: Vol. 5  (50100)
 Various Artists – Duck Down Presents  (50117)
 Various Artists – 3 Strikes  (50118)
 Various Artists – J Prince Presents: R.N.D.S.  (50119)
 Various Artists – World Wrestling Federation Presents: Aggression  (50120)
 Various Artists – Ultimate Bass Challenge Vol. 2  (50122)
 Various Artists – J Prince Presents: R.N.D.S. "Edit Version"  (50123)
 Various Artists – Blair Witch 2: Book Of Shadows  (50155)
 Various Artists – The Perfect Trance  (50162)
 Various Artists – Ozzfest: Second Stage Live  (50197)
 Various Artists – Boot Camp clik's Greatest Hits: Basic Training
 Various Artists – Hip Hop For Respect
 Various Artists – Suge Knight Represents: Chronic 2000
 Various Artists – Training Day
 Various Artists – Bones soundtrack''
 Various Artists – Holiday Moods Vol. 2: Another Enchanted Christmas
 Various Artists – Lyricist Lounge Vol. 2
 Various Artists – Mean Green: Major Players Compilation  (53505)
 Various Artists – Suge Knight Represents: Chronic 2000
 Various Artists – Latino Latino: Music From The Streets Of L.A. (57139)
 Various Artists – Rhythm Safari: The Best Of World Music (57137)

References

Discographies of American record labels